Keystone High School may refer to:

Keystone Charter School — Sandy Valley, Nevada
Keystone High School (LaGrange, Ohio) 
Keystone Oaks High School — Pittsburgh, Pennsylvania
Keystone Job Corp High School — Drums, Pennsylvania
Keystone Junior/Senior High School — Knox, Pennsylvania
Keystone Heights Junior-Senior High School — Keystone Heights, Florida
Keystone National High School a correspondence school — Pennsylvania
Keystone School — San Antonio, Texas